Stitcher is a media company that specializes in the creation, distribution, and monetization of podcasts. Stitcher creates original shows through networks such as Earwolf and Witness Docs. Stitcher provides ad sales and distribution services to 300+ shows. Stitcher is home to one of the largest podcast listening apps. In July 2020, it was acquired by SiriusXM. The acquisition was finalized by 19 October 2020.

History

Stitcher was founded in 2008 by Noah Shanok, Mike Ghaffary, and Peter deVroede. The company began with just the listening app and was venture-backed until 2014 when it was acquired by Deezer. In 2016, Deezer sold Stitcher for $4.5 million to Midroll Media, a digital media company founded in 2012 and acquired by E.W. Scripps Company in 2015. In 2017, Midroll Media underwent a rebranding, making Stitcher the parent company to Midroll Media and Earwolf, another entity under the E.W. Scripps network.

In July 2020, Sirius XM acquired the company for $325 million.

Operations 
Users can listen to and download podcasts through apps on iOS, Android, the Web, and several vehicle integrations. Stitcher also offers Stitcher Premium, a subscription service that allows listeners to access exclusive ad-free podcasts, which was announced at the end of 2016 and went live early 2017.

Stitcher currently operates 3 original content networks with over 50 shows from Earwolf (home to shows like Comedy Bang! Bang!, Office Ladies, How Did This Get Made?), Witness Docs (Unfinished: Deep South, The Dream, Verified), and Stitcher Originals (The Sporkful, By The Book, Science Rules!).

Reception 
Stitcher's revenue has been reported to increase 42% year over year, with its 2019 revenue reaching $73 million. Prior versions of the  app have been recognized as one of the best podcast apps for both Android and iOS.

See also 
 Earwolf
 Deezer
 Internet radio
 iPhone
 last.fm
 MeeMix
 Pandora Radio
 Radiolicious
 SoundCloud
 Spotify
 TuneIn

References

External links
 
 Stitcher - Podcast Player on Google Play
 Stitcher - Podcast Player on iTunes

Internet radio in the United States
Android (operating system) software
BlackBerry software
IOS software
Companies based in San Francisco
Android Auto software
Podcasting companies
Podcasting software